The Weightlifting event at the 2022 Mediterranean Games was held in Oran, Algeria, from 1 to 4 July 2022.

Medal table

Medal summary

Men's events

Women events

Men's results

Men's 61 kg

Men's 73 kg

Men's 89 kg

Men's 102 kg

Men's +102 kg

Women's results

Women's 49 kg

Women's 59 kg

Women's 71 kg

References

External links
Official site
IWF results
Results book

Sports at the 2022 Mediterranean Games
2022
Mediterranean Games